Theos may refer to:
 THEOS, a computer operating system
 THEOS (satellite), a satellite launched in 2008 by Thailand
 Theos (think tank), a UK public theology think tank
 Theos (θεός) means deity in Ancient Greek

People with the name
 Theos Casimir Bernard (1908–1947), American explorer and author

See also
 Thea (disambiguation)
 Theion (disambiguation)